= St. Anne's Society =

The St. Anne's Society is a Catholic support group for women in the United States. It was founded in 1881 by Anna Wick as the St. Anne's Mother's Society. Its purpose is to provide an opportunity for families to assist parish programs, to be involved in spiritual, educational. Encourage women blessed with the gift of motherhood to fulfill their vocation with the, humility, dignity and love of St. Anne.

St. Anne's Society is active in almost every Catholic parish of Polonia in the United States.

Anna (Hebrew: hanna) means "grace". St. Anne is the patroness of mothers, pregnant women, widows, sailors, poor schools, and Christians.

== The St. Anne's Society ==
- Aurora, IL - Holy Angels Parish
- Galveston, TX - Holy Family Parish
- Gloucester, England - St. Anne Society of Gloucester
- Greenville, SC - St. Joseph's Catholic School
- Harbor Springs, Michigan - Holy Childhood of Jesus Parish
- High Hill, TX - St. Mary Parish
- Houston, TX - St. Vincent de Paul Parish
- Monona, WI - Immaculate Heart of Mary Parish
- Woodlands, TX - St. Anthony of Padua Parish
- New Castle, IN - St. Anne Parish
